Wanapum Dam is a run-of-the-river hydroelectric project located on the Columbia River downstream (south) from Vantage, Washington where Interstate 90 crosses the Columbia from Grant County into Kittitas County. It is owned by the Grant County Public Utility District. Its reservoir is named Lake Wanapum.

The dam, and its lake, are named after the Wanapum Indians. The dam has a rated capacity of 1,185 megawatts and annually generates over 4 million megawatt-hours.

History 
The Wanapum dam was originally licensed in 1955 for a period of 50 years. Construction was initiated in 1959 with initial beneficial operation in 1963. The initial license expired in 2005, after which the Grant County PUD operated the dam on yearly license extensions while negotiations for license extension proceeded. The Federal Energy Regulatory Commission approved a license extension of 44 years for both the Wanapum dam and the downstream Priest Rapids Dam on April 17, 2008. The license extension was conditioned upon programs to achieve the following goals:

 modernize the power generation capability of the dam
 monitor water quality
 improve wildlife habitat
 protect nearly 700 Wanapum Tribe archaeological sites in the vicinity
 enhance recreation with new campsites, picnic areas and trails

Spillway crack 

During the time that the water level was lowered for repairs, all beaches and water access in the area above the dam were closed to protect sensitive cultural resources and help to ensure public safety. Public access was restored in the spring of 2015.

After an 11-week inspection, the primary reason for the crack was determined to be a mathematical error during the pre-construction design of the dam. Repairs of the cracked monolith and the strengthening of the remaining monoliths were made in 2014-2015. The $61 million fix, used steel cabling and rods to stitch the dam to the bedrock underneath.

See also

List of dams in the Columbia River watershed
Sensor fish, a device used to study the impact of fish travelling through the Wanapum and other dams

References

External links
Biological Assessment of the Advanced Turbine Design at Wanapum Dam, 2005, Pacific Northwest National Laboratory - a study of the impact of the dam on fish

Dams on the Columbia River
Dams in Washington (state)
Buildings and structures in Grant County, Washington
Hydroelectric power plants in Washington (state)
Buildings and structures in Kittitas County, Washington
United States local public utility dams
Dams completed in 1963
Energy infrastructure completed in 1963
Earth-filled dams
Gravity dams
1963 establishments in Washington (state)